This is a timeline of notable events relating to BBC Radio 1, a British national radio station which began in September 1967.

1960s 
 1967
30 September – BBC Radio 1 launches at 7:00, replacing the BBC Light Programme as well, with Tony Blackburn joining the station. He welcomes listeners to "the exciting sound of Radio 1" and then plays the station's first track: The Move's "Flowers in the Rain". Other presents joining to launch the station include John Peel, Stuart Henry, Terry Wogan, Jimmy Young, Dave Cash, Simon Dee, David Symonds, Tommy Vance and Emperor Rosko. 
Saturday Club, Junior Choice, [[Easy Beat (radio programme)|Easy Beat]], Pick of the Pops and Radio 1 Breakfast broadcast on Radio 1 for the first time.
1 October – The first Peel Session takes place. Aired as part of his new show Top Gear, the session features psychedelic rock band Tomorrow.

 1968
27 January – Tony Blackburn presents the breakfast show on Saturdays for the final time. Rather than replace him, BBC Radio 1 simulcasts the entirety of The Radio 2 Breakfast Show.
Kenny Everett and Ed Stewart join.

1969
18 January – Saturday Club broadcasts for the last time.
April – Johnnie Walker begins his first stint at BBC Radio 1, as he joins the station. He had three stints at the station until 1995.
Noel Edmonds and Dave Lee Travis join, Simon Dee leaves.

1970s
1970
 8 February – Annie Nightingale joins the station, as its first female presenter.
 July – Kenny Everett was dismissed after making cheeky remarks about the Transport Minister's wife following a news item.
 For a brief period, Radio 1 is heard on VHF in London when the station is used to broadcast test transmissions for the launch of BBC Radio London.
October – The  In Concert brand starts to be used for the station's live and recorded concerts.
Bob Harris joins.

1971
BBC Radio 1 launches its first promotion badges using the slogan Go Radio 1 Better on 247.
BBC Radio 1 airs its first documentary: The Elvis Presley Story, narrated by Wink Martindale.
9 September – Dave Cash leaves.
9 October – Roundtable, a weekly discussion of the week's new releases, begins. The programme's first presenter is Emperor Rosko.

1972
 April – Terry Wogan leaves the station to join BBC Radio 2.
 24 September – Alan Freeman steps down from presenting Pick of the Pops, which was the original singles chart that was first broadcast on the BBC Light Programme.
1 October – The first edition of a new Sunday teatime programme Solid Gold Sixty is broadcast on BBC Radio 1. Presented by Tom Browne, the programme consists of two hours featuring the Radio One playlist tracks which were not in the Top 20. It was followed by a one-hour Top 20 rundown from 6pm–7pm which was carried also on BBC Radio 2's FM transmitters.

1973
8 April – Kenny Everett briefly returns before moving to Capital Radio and BBC Radio 2 in 1981.
1 June – Tony Blackburn presents his final Radio 1 Breakfast, having fronted the show since the station went on air in 1967. 
4 June – Noel Edmonds takes over as presenter of Radio 1 Breakfast with Tony Blackburn moving to the mid-morning slot, he takes over from Jimmy Young who leaves the station to join BBC Radio 2. One of the new features is The Golden Hour, an hour of records that charted in the same year.
27 June – Tommy Vance leaves the station for a while to join Capital Radio.
23 July – The first Radio 1 Roadshow takes place, broadcast from Newquay, Cornwall. It is hosted by Alan Freeman.
10 September – Newsbeat bulletins air for the first time and Richard Skinner joins the station, as one of the new programme's presenters.
David Symonds leaves the station to join Capital Radio.

1974
17 March – Solid Gold Sixty is broadcast for the final time, it is replaced the following week by a one-hour programme which just features the Top 20 singles chart.
24 March – Paul Burnett joins.
BBC Radio 1 hosts its first Fun Day.
Stuart Henry leaves and Paul Gambaccini joins.

1975
6 January – Broadcasting hours are reduced, due to budget cuts at the BBC. All evening programming stops on BBC Radio 1 and the station simulcasts BBC Radio 2 every evening from 7pm. Consequently, Sounds of the 70s ends and Bob Harris leaves the station for a while. Also, the weekday afternoon programme, presented by David Hamilton, is broadcast on both stations and John Peel's show is moved to the drivetime slot.
11 January – Alan Freeman broadcasts a live performance by Pink Floyd which featured a performance of The Dark Side of the Moon in its entirety. The performance was recorded at the Empire Pool on 16 November 1974.
September – The first edition of The Sunday Request Show is broadcast, hosted by Annie Nightingale. The show runs until 1979 before being reintroduced in 1982, running until May 1994.
25 September – The final edition of Top Gear is broadcast.
27 September – Paul Gambaccini, who joined the station the previous year, presents his first American chart countdown programme.
29 September – Some late weeknight evening programming returns and John Peel's show moves back to late evenings. For this, BBC Radio 1 uses BBC Radio 2's VHF/FM frequencies on weeknights again (having previously done so from October 1971 to December 1974, for shows hosted by Peel, Annie Nightingale and Bob Harris among others). This one-hour show on weeknights is the only time of the evening that BBC Radio 1 broadcasts its own programmes and BBC Radio 1 now ends weekday transmissions an hour earlier at 6pm. 
Mike Smith joins.

1976
JAM Creative Productions of Dallas, Texas begins at 20-year relationship with BBC Radio 1 when it produces its first jingles package for the station. JAM also created Radio 2's jingles. Previously, BBC Radio 1's jingles had been produced by PAMS.  (PAMS was also based in Dallas and the company was purchased by JAM Productions).
2 May – BBC Radio 1 launches Playground, a "magazine programme of special interest to young listeners". The new programme incorporates Young Ideas in Action which had previously been broadcast as part of Junior Choice.
May – Simon Bates joins and gets his first regular show.
September – Emperor Rosko leaves the station to return to America.
December – The first Festive Fifty is revealed by John Peel.
David Jensen joins and Johnnie Walker leaves the station for a while to work in America.

1977
4 April – BBC Radio 1 extends its weeknight broadcasting hours. The station's daytime weekday programmes are extended by an hour to 7pm and the John Peel show is also extended by an hour to two hours. Consequently, Radio 1 now borrows Radio 2's VHF/FM frequencies for two hours each weeknight, between 10pm and midnight. 
28 November – From that day, BBC Radio 1 has its own all-day weekday schedule with the launch of a new afternoon programme presented by Tony Blackburn. David Hamilton's show, simulcast on both stations since January 1975, moves to BBC Radio 2 only. Tony is replaced on mid-mornings by Simon Bates. Consequently, BBC Radio 1 now has its own all-day schedule on weekdays. However, the station continues to simulcast BBC Radio 2 each night from 7pm apart from the weekday late night John Peel's programme.
Peter Powell joins.

1978
Mike Read joins and Mike Smith and Alan Freeman both leave for a while to join Capital Radio.
17 April – David Jensen replaces Dave Lee Travis as host of the weekday drivetime programme and his Saturday mid-morning show is taken over by Adrian Juste who joins the station.
28 April – Noel Edmonds presents Radio 1 Breakfast for the final time.
2 May – Dave Lee Travis takes over as presenter of Radio 1 Breakfast.
12 November – The Sunday teatime chart show is extended from a Top 20 countdown to a Top 40 countdown. Simon Bates is the presenter, having taken over as host from Tom Browne earlier in the year.
17 November – Tommy Vance, one of the station's original presenters, rejoins the station to present a new programme, The Friday Rock Show. Consequently, John Peel is now on air four nights a week instead of five.
23 November – Radio 1 moves from 247m (1214 kHz) to 275 & 285m (1053 & 1089 kHz) medium wave as part of a plan to improve national AM reception and to conform with the Geneva Frequency Plan of 1975. 
22 December – Industrial action at the BBC by the ABS union which started the previous day, extends to radio when the radio unions join their television counterparts by going on strike. It forces the BBC to merge its four national radio networks into one national radio station from 4pm named the BBC All Network Radio Service. The strike is settled shortly before 10pm on the same day with the unions and BBC management reaching an agreement at the government's industrial disputes arbitration service, Acas.

1979
Annie Nightingale's request show leaves the airwaves for a while.
29 January – BBC Radio 1 begins its delayed weeknight mid-evening programme with Andy Peebles joining the station to host the new it. It had originally been scheduled to launch on 13 November 1978, but was delayed as a result of trade union disputes.
26 August – Simon Bates steps down from Sunday Top 40 hosting.
2 September – Tony Blackburn replaces Simon Bates as host of the Sunday Top 40.

1980s
1980
5 January – Tony Blackburn replaces Ed Stewart as host of Junior Choice, as Ed leaves the station to join BBC Radio 2. Steve Wright joins the station to present the Saturday evening show.
31 March – BBC Radio 1's broadcast hours are cut back. The station starts broadcasting on weekdays an hour later and Saturday evening programming ends. The station simulcasts BBC Radio 2 during this additional downtime although, by the end of the year, BBC Radio 1 has stopped broadcasting BBC Radio 2 through the night.
 29 May – David Jensen leaves for a while to work for the Turner Broadcasting System WTBS cable superstation in Atlanta, Georgia.
6 December – Andy Peebles interviews John Lennon and Yoko Ono in New York City, two days before Lennon is assassinated.

1981
2 January – Dave Lee Travis steps down from presenting Radio 1 Breakfast.
5 January – Mike Read succeeds Dave Lee Travis as presenter of Radio 1 Breakfast.
30 March – Steve Wright who joined the station the previous year, takes over the weekday afternoon slot, thereby launching Steve Wright in the Afternoon. His new show brings the zoo format to the UK.
5 October – David Jensen returns to the station to present a new weekday evening show from 8pm to 10pm. 

1982
3 January – Tony Blackburn hosts the Sunday Top 40 for the final time, as he counts down the best selling singles of 1981.
10 January – Tommy Vance replaces Tony Blackburn as host of the Sunday Top 40 show.
27 February – The final editions of Junior Choice and Playground are broadcast.
6 March – After the ending of Junior Choice, the weekend show is renamed as Radio 1's Weekend Breakfast Show with Maggie Philbin and Keith Chegwin joining Tony Blackburn as co-presenters.
9-10 April – BBC Radio 1 broadcasts a non-stop Marathon Music Quiz. Featuring two teams, Radio 1 and the Music Industry. It is scheduled to run continuously for 26 hours plus 385 minutes with Mike Read as quizmaster for the whole of the quiz. The overnight portion is broadcast live. 
6 September – Pat Sharp joins.
4 December – The transmission time lost in March 1980 is regained. Programmes once again begin at 6am, finally ending all simulcasts between BBC Radio 1 and BBC Radio 2. Mike Smith returns to the station to present the new weekday early show. Weekend early shows are introduced with Adrian John and Pat Sharp who joined the station in September to host the new programmes. The station also recommences Saturday evening broadcasting with Janice Long and Gary Davies also joining the station to present the new shows. Programming is also extended by two hours on Sunday evenings with Annie Nightingale's request show returning to the airwaves after three years away. Thus, BBC Radio 1 is now on air daily from 6am until midnight.
Paul Burnett leaves.

1983
28 February – Adrian John takes over the weekday early show from Mike Smith.
27 March – Noel Edmonds leaves. 
1 October – Pat Sharp leaves.
18 December – Sounds of Jazz is broadcast on BBC Radio 1 for the final time. From the new year, the show will be broadcast on BBC Radio 2.

1984
1 January 
Tommy Vance steps down hosting the Top 40 show, as he counts down the best selling singles of 1983.
Robbie Vincent joins the station on a permanent basis to present a Sunday evening soul music show.
8 January – Simon Bates returns to the Sunday teatime Top 40 programme, but only for a few months as Richard Skinner will take over as host on 30 September.
26 March – Gary Davies replaces Mike Smith as host of the weekday lunchtime programme, as Mike leaves for a while to present BBC1's  Breakfast Time.
David Jensen leaves the station to join Capital Radio and is replaced on the mid-evening show by Janice Long.
10 September – Bruno Brookes joins and replaces Peter Powell as the presenter of the teatime show.
23 September – Tony Blackburn, the first voice heard on Radio 1, presents his final show as he leaves the station to rejoin BBC Radio London.  
29 September – The weekend breakfast show is revamped with Peter Powell replacing Tony Blackburn as the presenter. The children's requests element of the show is dropped.
30 September – Richard Skinner replaces Simon Bates as the host of the Sunday teatime Top 40 programme.
Rod McKenzie joins.

1985
31 March – The Ranking Miss P becomes the station's first black female DJ where she begins presenting the station's first reggae programme. 
6 July – Andy Kershaw joins.
13 July – BBC Radio 1 broadcasts full, live coverage of the Live Aid concert.
Johnny Beerling replaces Derek Chinnery as station controller, as Derek leaves and Johnny joins the station.
The station's studios move to Egton House.

1986
February – Paul Gambaccini presents his final American chart programme, as he leaves the station for a while to join Capital Radio in 1988.
23 March – Richard Skinner presents the Sunday Top 40 for the final time.
29 March – Richard Skinner leaves the station for a while to join Capital Radio.
30 March – Bruno Brookes takes over as the host of The Official Chart.
18 April – Mike Read presents his final Radio 1 Breakfast after five years in the hot seat.
3 May – Simon Mayo joins.
5 May – Mike Smith rejoins the station for the last time, after spending the past two years working for BBC TV, to take over Radio 1 Breakfast from Mike Read. The same day also sees BBC Radio 1 begin broadcasting on weekdays 30 minutes earlier, at 5:30am.

1987
17 January – Johnnie Walker rejoins the station to present a new Saturday afternoon programme: The Stereo Sequence. The programme which runs for  hours, incorporates the previous stand-alone Saturday afternoon shows, including the weekly look at the American charts which is shortened to an hour.
24 March – There was a station support and a premiere airing for the Ferry Aid charity single "Let It Be", raising cash for victims of the Zeebrugge disaster. 
4 October – From this day, the new The Official Chart is released on the Sunday afternoon chart show. Previously, the programme had played songs from the chart which had been released the previous Tuesday.
9 October – Jeff Young joins the station to present Big Beat, a new weekly Friday evening dance and rap music programme.
31 October – BBC Radio 1 begins launching its FM frequency, starting in London, initially on 104.8MHz before moving to the 97–99 frequency range allocated to the station.
8 November – Bruno Brookes reveals the 600th UK No. 1 single on The Official Chart as "China in Your Hand" by T'Pau. Over the following three weeks and to mark the musical milestone, Radio 1 plays all 600 singles to have reached number one since the UK Singles Chart was launched in 1952.
Nicky Campbell, Liz Kershaw and Mark Goodier join, Janice Long leaves.

1988
January – The station has a More Music Day which limited presenter chat to news, weather and travel. Designed as an answer to those who thought that DJs talk too much, it has not been repeated.
May – Johnnie Walker ends his second stint at the station as he leaves for a while and Roger Scott joins the station and takes over as host of The Stereo Sequence.
23 May – Simon Mayo takes over as presenter of Radio 1 Breakfast, replacing Mike Smith who leaves the station. The new programme takes on a zoo format by introducing co-hosts and new features.
1 September 
The Radio 1 FM 'switch on' day which sees three new transmitters brought into service covering central Scotland, the north of England and the Midlands. With 65% of the UK now covered by the station's new FM frequency, the pop group Bros fly around the country in a helicopter to encourage listeners to switch over. 
To coincide with the switch-ons, Top of the Pops is simulcast on the station for the first time giving listeners the chance to hear the programme in stereo.
25 September – Peter Powell leaves and dropping the early show as Nicky Campbell moves to weekdays.
29 September 
BBC Radio 1 'borrows' BBC Radio 2's FM frequencies on a weeknight for the final time.
BBC Radio 1 starts broadcasting on FM in South Wales and the west of England. 
1 October
BBC Radio 1 extends its broadcasting hours, closing down at 2am instead of midnight. This results in a new weekday evening schedule with John Peel moving to an earlier evening slot, Nicky Campbell taking over the late show and Richard Skinner rejoins the station, after two years with Capital Radio, to host the new midnight to 2am show.
Mark Goodier and Liz Kershaw replace Peter Powell as presenters of Radio 1's Weekend Breakfast Show.The Stereo Sequence is renamed The Saturday Sequence.
2 October
 BBC Radio 1 stops borrowing BBC Radio 2's FM frequencies on Sunday evenings after 7pm.
 The UK Top 40 is the only remaining programme left to continue to borrow Radio 2's frequencies between 5pm and 7pm on Sundays.
24 November – BBC Radio 1 starts broadcasting on FM in Belfast and Oxfordshire with a simulcast of Top of the Pops. To mark the event, the next day's breakfast show and Simon Bates programmes are broadcast live from the two areas.
Jackie Brambles joins.

1989
Some BBC Local Radio stations broadcast Radio 1 during their evening downtime, doing so because Radio 1's network of FM transmitters does not currently cover their broadcast area.
15 January – Alan Freeman rejoins the station to revive his Pick of the Pops and The Rock Show radio shows.
1 April – BBC Radio 1 starts broadcasting slightly earlier each morning and is now on air between 5am and 2am seven days a week. Tim Smith joins the station to host the new weekend early show and Bruno Brookes replaces Mark Goodier as co-host of weekend breakfast with Liz Kershaw.
3 July–13 September – Simon Bates and producer Jonathan Ruffle set off on an 80-day circumnavigation of the world to raise money for Oxfam. Their progress is charted in a broadcast each weekday morning.
29 September – Adrian John leaves the station after presenting the weekday early show for the past six years. He is replaced the following week by Jackie Brambles who had joined the station the previous year. 
8 October – Roger Scott hosts his final show before his death on 31 October.
31 October – Bob Harris rejoins the station as Roger Scott's Sunday late show replacement.
19 December – BBC Radio 1 starts transmitting on FM across the whole of south-east England (replacing the temporary London transmitter), in East Anglia, in north Cumbria and south Scotland and in the Cardigan Bay area.
30 December – BBC Radio 1 broadcasts on BBC Radio 2's FM frequencies on Saturday afternoons for the final time.
December – Robbie Vincent leaves.

1990s
1990
8 January 
A new 30-minute news programme News 90 replaces the teatime edition of Newsbeat, it is presented by Sybil Ruscoe and Allan Robb.
A new jingles package called Music Radio for the 90s is launched.
11 February – BBC Radio 1 starts broadcasting on FM in most of south-west England.
17 March – Shortly after joining the station, Gary King replaces Tim Smith at weekends before moving to weekdays to take over the weekday early show. He replaces Jackie Brambles who moves to the weekday drivetime show.
25 March – BBC Radio 1 'borrows' BBC Radio 2's FM frequencies for the final time. Consequently, some BBC local radio stations in areas where Radio 1 is still not available on FM, broadcast the Top 40 show whilst Radio 1's FM network continues to expand to more areas. 
12 April – BBC Radio 1 starts broadcasting on FM throughout north-east England (having previously had a low-power transmitter for Newcastle upon Tyne for a period) as this area is a renowned heartland of heavy rock music, Tommy Vance hosts a special Friday Rock Show live from Newcastle to mark the occasion.
24 May – BBC Radio 1 begins FM transmission in central-southern England with Steve Wright's show outside broadcast from Goodwood Racecourse. Also during 1990, the transmitters established in 1988 move to higher power.
28 September – The Ranking Miss P leaves.
30 September – Mark Goodier replaces Bruno Brookes as host of BBC Radio 1's Top 40 show. 
1 October – A shake-up of the station's evening schedules sees the debut of a new-music show The Evening Session, as John Peel's show moves to weekends.
Paul Gambaccini rejoins, Jenny Costello joins to host the Weekend Early Show.

1991
Lynn Parsons, Mark Radcliffe and Marc Riley join, Richard Skinner leaves.
6 January – For the first time, BBC Radio 1's Sunday chart show plays all 40 tracks and the show is renamed The Complete Top 40. This becomes possible due to an extension of the programme's duration, starting half an hour earlier at 4:30pm.
11 January – Pete Tong joins the station, to present a new Friday evening dance show called The Essential Selection.
17 January – BBC Radio 1 begins broadcasting a temporary 24-hour service in order to provide round-the-clock updates with the latest events in the Gulf War which includes news bulletins every 30 minutes. The 2am to 5am closedown reappears by the end of the month, although the half hourly news bulletins continue until the end of the war.
4 April – Pete Tong presents the first edition of the station's first show dedicated solely to rap music. Called The Rap Selection, the show is broadcast on Thursday evenings and lasts until March 1992.
1 May – BBC Radio 1 begins broadcasting a continuous 24-hour service on a permanent basis, but only on FM as the station's MW frequencies are switched off each night between midnight and 6am.
5–30 August – Phil Collins, The Pet Shop Boys, Jason Donovan and Whitney Houston are Bates' Mates who deputised for Simon Bates on BBC Radio 1.
29 August – Top of the Pops simulcasts on BBC Radio 1 for the last time, the programme is introduced by Jackie Brambles.
27 September – Mike Read leaves the station to join Capital Radio.
28 September – Johnnie Walker rejoins for the third and final time to begin his third stint as the station's Saturday afternoon presenter. He replaces Mike Read and Richard Skinner.
Tim Smith, Jenny Costello and Jeff Young leave, Paul McKenna joins to present the Weekend Early Show, but later leaves.

1992
9 February – The final edition of Bruno Brookes' and Liz Kershaw's Radio 1's Weekend Breakfast Show is broadcast as Liz Kershaw herself leaves the station, ahead of major changes to the station's weekend programming line-up.
21 February – Gary Davies presents his final 'Bit in the Middle' weekday lunchtime show.
24 February – Jackie Brambles replaces Gary Davies as presenter of the weekday lunchtime show.
6 March – Round Table is broadcast for the final time.
9 March – BBC Radio 1 undergoes a schedule revamp with several changes at the weekend, including Gary Davies becoming host of the weekend breakfast show. Gary King and Andy Peebles leave. The changes also see the introduction of a new jingles package, based on the theme Closer to the Music. As part of the changes,The Rap Selection broadcasts for the final time. 
15 March 
Chris Evans makes his BBC Radio 1 debut as he joins the station, presenting a short-lived Sunday early-afternoon show called Too Much Gravy.
Bruno Brookes begins his second stint as host of the UK Top 40 programme. It is extended once again and now airs from 4pm until 7pm, allowing sufficient time for all songs to be played in full. 
20 April – The Freddie Mercury Tribute Concert for AIDS Awareness, an open-air concert in tribute to the late Freddie Mercury who died in November 1991, is held at London's Wembley Stadium. The concert is broadcast on BBC Two and BBC Radio 1 in the UK and is televised worldwide.
30 August – 100,000 people attend Radio 1's biggest ever Radio 1 Roadshow to celebrate the 25th anniversary of the station. The event, held at Sutton Park in the West Midlands, features live performances from bands including Del Amitri, Aswad, The Farm and Status Quo.
27 September – Chris Evans leaves the station for a while to co-present Channel 4's new breakfast show The Big Breakfast. 
27 December – Pick of the Pops is broadcast on BBC Radio 1 for the final time.

1993
Claire Sturgess joins.
26 March – After nearly 15 years of presenting The Friday Rock Show, Tommy Vance leaves to go to new station Virgin 1215 and Claire Sturgess takes over.
18 April – The Official 1 FM Album Chart show is broadcast for the first time. Presented by Lynn Parsons, the 60-minute programme is broadcast on Sunday evenings, immediately after the Top 40 singles chart.
8 August – Dave Lee Travis resigns on air and leaves the station stating that he could not agree with changes that were being made to Radio 1. He told his audience that changes were afoot that he could not tolerate "and I really want to put the record straight at this point and I thought you ought to know, changes are being made here which go against my principles and I just cannot agree with them".
16 August–20 September – Loud'n'proud, a series presented by DJ Paulette, was the UK's first national radio series aimed at a gay audience.
3 September – Simon Mayo leaves Radio 1 Breakfast after five years in the chair, ahead of his move to mid-mornings to replace Simon Bates.
6 September – Mark Goodier takes over as presenter of Radio 1 Breakfast and hosts the show until the end of the year.
September – Steve Lamacq and Jo Whiley both join the station and they replace Mark Goodier as co-presenters of The Evening Session. 
October – Major changes take place, designed to reposition the station to attract a younger audience, following Matthew Bannister replacing Johnny Beerling as controller, as Matthew joins and Johnny leaves the station. Long-standing DJs, including Simon Bates, Gary Davies, Bob Harris, Paul Gambaccini and Alan Freeman leave around this time. They are replaced with several new younger presenters and specialist music programmes, previously heard late at night are given weekend afternoon slots.
 30 October 
As part of the roll-out of the new schedule, Andy Kershaw and John Peel move from night time to Saturday afternoons and Danny Baker takes over the weekend morning show as he joins the station.
 The first Essential Mix dance music programme is broadcast.
24 December – Steve Wright in the Afternoon ends its 13-year run on Radio 1.

1994
1 January – Kevin Greening joins the station and takes over Radio 1's Weekend Breakfast Show from Gary Davies. 
8 January – Adrian Juste presents his last show on the station and leaves, having presented his Saturday lunchtime programme of music and comedy since 1978.
10 January 
Steve Wright becomes Radio 1's latest breakfast show presenter. Other changes on this day see Mark Goodier present a new early afternoon show with Nicky Campbell hosting the drivetime show and Emma Freud as the host of the lunchtime show (as Emma herself joins the station) to replace Jackie Brambles who leaves the station for a career in America.
The teatime edition of Newsbeat returns after four years away. The bulletin airs in its old slot between 5:30 and 5:45pm.  
1 May – Annie Nightingale hosts the request show for the final time, having presented the programme since 1975. Lynn Parsons takes over as the show's presenter the following week, but it is dropped entirely six months later.
8 May 
In the early hours of Sunday morning, Annie Nightingale launches her career as a club music DJ, presenting the first edition of The Chill Out Zone.
After six months of rocking Sunday afternoons, the rock show moves to mid-evenings, swapping slots with The Steve Edwards Soul Show.  
June – BBC Radio 1 begins broadcasting announcements on its medium wave frequency voiced by Nicky Campbell telling listeners to retune to FM because it will no longer be broadcasting on medium wave from 1 July.
1 July – BBC Radio 1's last broadcast on medium wave. Stephen Duffy's "Kiss Me" was the last record played on MW just before 9am.
19 September – Danny Rampling joins.
BBC Radio 1 starts broadcasting on satellite, using audio carriers on the Astra satellite. 
27 November – Clive Warren joins the station and takes over Weekend Breakfast from Kevin Greening who moves to Weekend Lunchtime. 
10 December – Tim Westwood joins the station to present the station's first long-standing rap show, although Pete Tong had hosted The Rap Selection in 1991 and 1992, a continuation of the National Fresh segment in Jeff Young's Friday night show in the late 1980s.

1995
Radio 1's FM network is completed and the station now has the same coverage on FM as the other BBC national stations.
Having been known on air as Radio 1 FM or even simply as 1FM since the start of the decade in order to promote the station's move to FM, the on air name reverts to BBC Radio 1.
January – As part of the major changes taking place at BBC Radio 1, older music (typically anything recorded before 1990) is dropped from the daytime playlist and Emma Freud hosts her final weekday lunchtime show as she leaves the station, she is replaced by Lisa I'Anson who joins the station.
21 April – Steve Wright and Bruno Brookes present their final shows as they leave the station.
23 April – After Bruno Brookes' departure, Mark Goodier begins his second stint as presenter of the Sunday afternoon Top 40 show.
24 April – Chris Evans takes over Radio 1 Breakfast from Steve Wright, following differences with the station's new management over restructuring as Chris rejoins the station. Dave Pearce joins the station to take over the early breakfast show.
9 May – Wendy Lloyd joins and hosts her first show.
July – The station holds its first Ibiza weekend.
27 September – BBC Radio 1 begins to broadcast digitally following the commencement by the BBC of regular Digital Audio Broadcasting from the Crystal Palace transmitting station.
21 October – Ahead of a schedule revamp, Johnnie Walker leaves the station. The changes include Clive Warren moving from the weekend breakfast show to the weekday early show, replacing Dave Pearce who launches a new weekend mid-morning show, replacing Kevin Greening. Kevin takes over weekend breakfasts which includes a new weekend breakfast Newsbeat, presented by Peter Bowes.

1996
4 February – Trevor Nelson joins the station to present the UK's first national R&B show Rhythm Nation.
June – BBC Radio 1 starts live streaming on the internet.
27 June – Wendy Lloyd hosts her final show as she leaves the station.
September – Danny Baker leaves to rejoin BBC Radio London.
Lynn Parsons leaves and Mary Anne Hobbs joins.
Lisa I'Anson moves to weekends.
BBC Radio 1 moves from Egton House to Yalding House.

1997
January – Chris Evans leaves Radio 1 Breakfast and the station, after he was dismissed for demanding Fridays off to work on his Channel 4 TV show TFI Friday.
17 February 
Mark and Lard become the breakfast show's new presenters.
Jo Whiley begins presenting a weekday lunchtime show.
July – Claire Sturgess leaves.
27 July – The first edition of Radio 1's Dance Anthems is broadcast, hosted by Dave Pearce.
28 July – Chris Moyles joins and becomes the new host of Early Breakfast.
31 August – Regular programming on the BBC's radio and television stations was abandoned to provide ongoing news coverage of the sad and tragic death of Diana, Princess of Wales with BBC Radio 1 airing a special programme from BBC Radio News which is also carried on BBC Radio 2, BBC Radio 3, BBC Radio 4 and BBC Radio 5 Live and The Official Chart doesn't air for the first time.
13 October – Mark and Lard move to an afternoon slot and Zoe Ball joins the station as Kevin Greening and Zoe herself replace them as presenters of the breakfast show.
October – Nicky Campbell leaves the station to join BBC Radio 5 Live and Judge Jules joins.

1998
Fabio & Grooverider join.
March – Andy Parfitt replaces Matthew Bannister as station controller, as Matthew leaves and Andy joins the station.
April – Emma B, Aled Haydn Jones and Gilles Peterson join.
25 September – Kevin Greening leaves the weekday breakfast show and weekdays, leaving Zoe Ball as sole presenter as he moves back to weekends to replace Clive Warren as host of the Sunday weekend breakfast show.
12 October – Chris Moyles is moved from Early Breakfast to present drivetime, between 4pm and 5:45pm on weekdays and later to 3pm and 5:45pm. He replaces Dave Pearce who moves to a new evening show. Scott Mills joins the station as the new host of early breakfast.

1999
February – Lisa I'Anson leaves.
11–12 March – Simon Mayo breaks the record for presenting the longest radio programme after hosting a 37-hour broadcast in aid of Red Nose Day 1999.
24 April – Jamie Theakston joins.
26 July–27 August – The Radio 1 Roadshow broadcasts for the final time.
19 August – BBC Radio 1 broadcasts its first split programming when it introduces weekly national new music shows for Scotland, Wales and Northern Ireland. One of the new presenters is Huw Stephens who joins the station and Bethan Elfyn also joins.
2 September – Colin Murray joins.
19 September – The first edition of a new Sunday evening advice programme called The Surgery is broadcast and Sara Cox joins.
25 September – Sara Cox co-hosts a new Saturday lunchtime show with Emma B.
BBC Radio 1's Live Lounge is established and launched as part of the mid-morning show with Simon Mayo, later Jo Whiley and Fearne Cotton and later Clara Amfo and Rickie, Melvin and Charlie.

2000s
2000
16 January – Kevin Greening leaves the station to join BBC Radio 5 Live. The following week, a new weekend breakfast show, The Breakfast Club, hosted by Sarah HB, launches as Sarah HB herself joins the station.
10 March – Zoe Ball presents her Radio 1 Breakfast for the final time as she leaves the station. Scott Mills begins a three-week stint as the show's temporary presenter.
3 April – Sara Cox takes over as presenter of Radio 1 Breakfast and Mark Chapman joins and starts hosting his first ever Newsbeat sports bulletins.
May – Andy Kershaw leaves the station to join BBC Radio 3. He had presented the station's world music programme since 1985.
September – Clive Warren leaves.
October – Nemone joins.
The Dreem Teem join.
BBC Radio 1's Big Weekend is broadcast for the first time.

2001
19 February – Jo Whiley takes over the morning show and begins presenting The Jo Whiley Show. She replaces Simon Mayo who leaves the station to join BBC Radio 5 Live and BBC Radio 2.
10 May – BBC Radio 1 loses its crown as the UK's most listened to radio station to BBC Radio 2.
BBC Radio 1, along with other stations, stop broadcasting via Sky's analogue satellite service.

2002The Evening Session is broadcast for the final time.
Jamie Theakston leaves.
March – Danny Rampling leaves and Rob da Bank, Bobby Friction and Nihal join.
16 August – Sister station BBC Radio 1Xtra launches.
17 November – Mark Goodier presents the Top 40 for the final time on the 50th anniversary of the chart and leaves the station due to falling audiences and BBC bosses considering him "too old for the job.""... station bosses want to replace him with someone younger, who will be more in tune with its target audience of 15 to 24-year-olds." 

2003
9 February – Wes Butters joins and becomes the new presenter of The Official Chart. Various presenters had hosted the show since Mark Goodier's departure in November last year.
29 March – Edith Bowman joins as Colin Murray and Edith herself start their shows together until 2006.
3 May – BBC Radio 1 cancels the first day of its 2003's BBC Radio 1's Big Weekend at Heaton Park, Manchester due to poor weather. However, the second day of the event goes ahead as scheduled.
7 September – Sarah HB hosts her final show as she leaves the station.
13–14 September – BBC Radio 1's second One Big Weekend festival takes place at Cardiff.
19 December – Sara Cox presents her final breakfast show and Chris Moyles presents his final drivetime show. 
 Zane Lowe joins the station to present a new weeknight evening show.
 The Dreem Teem leave.

2004
4 January – Vernon Kay joins.
5 January – Chris Moyles takes over breakfast show with a return of the zoo format and Sara Cox moves to drivetime until her maternity leave.
26 March – Mark and Lard (Mark Radcliffe and Marc Riley) present their final show as Radcliffe leaves the station to join BBC Radio 2 and Riley also leaves the station to join BBC Radio 6 Music after 11 years of broadcasting and one failed eight-month stint on Radio 1 Breakfast.
7 June – Scott Mills takes over as presenter of drivetime show.
July – JK and Joel join.
29 July – Annie Mac joins.
October – Carrie Davis joins and starts reading her first ever Newsbeat sports bulletins for The Chris Moyles Show. 
14 October – John Peel presents his final show on the station, before leaving for a working holiday in Peru. He dies eleven days later.

2005
30 January – Wes Butters leaves the station as he presents his final The Official Chart show.
5 February – Sara Cox returns from maternity leave to take over the Saturday and Sunday 1pm–4pm weekend lunchtime show.
6 March – JK and Joel take over as presenters of The Official Chart.
Emma B leaves.
September – Reggie Yates and Fearne Cotton join and Nemone leaves the station to join BBC Radio 6 Music. 
13 October – BBC Radio 1 hosts the first John Peel Day, a year after he presented his final show for the station which was two weeks before his death.

2006
8 March – BBC Radio 1 launches its YouTube channel.
August – Edith Bowman becomes the sole presenter and starts her own weekday lunchtime show.
25 September – Colin Murray becomes the sole presenter of his own weekday late-night show.

2007
1 June – Greg James and Chris Smith join.
30 September – JK and Joel leave.
14 October – Fearne Cotton and Reggie Yates take over as presenters of The Official Chart.
18 December – BBC Radio 1 is forced to backtrack on a decision to begin playing a censored version of The Pogues' 1987 Christmas hit Fairytale of New York. The song which sees Kirsty MacColl and Shane MacGowan trading insults has the words "faggot" and "slut" edited out to "avoid offence", but after a day of criticism from listeners, the band and MacColl's mother, the decision is reversed and the original version played in full.
BBC Introducing is launched, providing a vital platform for thousands of emerging musical talent. A decade later, over 460,000 tracks have been uploaded to the BBC Music Introducing website and 170,000 artists are registered.
Nick Grimshaw and Kissy Sell Out join.

2008
MistaJam joins.
1 August – Dave Pearce leaves.

2009
18 September – Jo Whiley presents her final weekday mid-morning show and Edith Bowman also hosts her final weekday lunchtime show as they move to weekends.
21 September – Fearne Cotton takes over the weekday mid-morning show and stops presenting The Official Chart and also Greg James takes over the weekday lunchtime show.
27 September – Reggie Yates becomes the sole presenter of The Official Chart.
24 December – Mark Chapman leaves the station after hosting his last Newsbeat sports bulletins to work for BBC Sport and ESPN.
Colin Murray, Steve Lamacq and Bobby Friction leave and Dev joins.

2010s
2010
8 January – Matt Edmondson joins.
12 February – Carrie Davis leaves the station after reading her last Newsbeat sports bulletins for The Chris Moyles Show, to work for BBC Sport.
15 February – Tina Daheley joins the station and replaces Carrie Davis on Newsbeat sports bulletins for The Chris Moyles Show and later hosts news, sport and weather bulletins for Radio 1 Breakfast with Nick Grimshaw from 24 September 2012.
10 March – The Official Chart Update is launched to give a midweek insight into the Official Singles Chart is shaping up. and is broadcast as a 30 minute mid-afternoon programme on Wednesdays.
31 May – BBC Radio 1 teams up with forces broadcaster BFBS for a ten-hour takeover show from Camp Bastion, Afghanistan.
Mary Anne Hobbs leaves.
Bethan Elfyn leaves the station after 11 years of broadcasting to join BBC Radio Wales.

2011
9 January – Tom Deacon joins.
16–18 March – Chris Moyles breaks the record for presenting the longest radio programme, after hosting a 52-hour live broadcast in aid of Red Nose Day 2011.
27 March – Jo Whiley leaves the station after 17 years of broadcasting to join BBC Radio 2.
21 July – The BBC confirms that Andy Parfitt will step down as Controller of BBC Radio 1 after 13 years to pursue other opportunities from the end of the month.
31 July – Andy Parfitt leaves.
28 October – Ben Cooper is appointed as Controller of BBC Radio 1 and BBC Radio 1Xtra, replacing Andy Parfitt who stepped down in July.

2012
26 February – The Top Ten countdown from The Official Chart is made available in vision for the first time through the station's website.
1 April – Tom Deacon leaves the station for a while and Edith Bowman hosts her final weekend breakfast show as she moves back to weekdays in March 2013 to replace Nihal on Tuesday nights.
2 April – A shake-up of the schedule sees Scott Mills and Greg James swapping shows, James hosting the drivetime show and Mills the afternoon show. Also, major changes take place to the dance music schedule: Skream & Benga, Toddla T, Charlie Sloth and Friction take over from Judge Jules, Gilles Peterson, Kissy Sell Out and Fabio & Grooverider as Judge, Gilles, Kissy, and Fabio & Grooverider leave the station and also as Skream & Benga, Toddla, Charlie, and Friction join the station, resulting in a shuffle of most late night shows from Monday to Saturday to incorporate the new line-up.
8 April – Gemma Cairney joins the station, as she replaces Edith Bowman at weekends.
June – The regional new music shows are scrapped after thirteen years as a cost-cutting measure. and replaced by BBC Introducing.
20 June – The BBC Trust says that Radio 1's core audience is still too old, despite changes made to output following an amendment to the wording of its service licence in 2009. The station is aimed at the 15–29-year age group, but the average age of their listeners is 30.
23–24 June – 100,000 people attend Radio 1's Hackney Weekend, a two-day music concert at Hackney Marshes which forms part of the build-up to the 2012 Summer Olympics.
11 July – Chris Moyles announces that he will leave Radio 1 Breakfast and the station on 14 September. It is confirmed that he will be succeeded by Nick Grimshaw on 24 September.
14 September – Chris Moyles hosts his final show as he leaves the station after 15 years of broadcasting. 
24 September – Nick Grimshaw takes over Radio 1 Breakfast. 
14 December – Radio 1 broadcast its last show from Yalding House.
22 December – Vernon Kay leaves.
23 December – Reggie Yates leaves.

2013
January – A series of changes take place. Jameela Jamil is announced as the new presenter of The Official Chart, Matt Edmondson is to host a weekend morning show and Tom Deacon rejoins the station to present a Wednesday night show. YouTubers Dan Howell and Phil Lester also join the station.
7 January – Alice Levine joins. 
13 January – Jameela Jamil joins and becomes the new presenter of The Official Chart.
19 March – Nihal presents his final Radio 1's Review Tuesday night show. 
26 March – Edith Bowman returns to weekdays to replace Nihal on Radio 1's Review on Tuesday nights. 
3 April – Tom Deacon leaves the station after hosting his last Wednesday night show.
12 April – BBC Radio 1 controller Ben Cooper announces that the station's The Official Chart will not air "Ding-Dong! The Witch Is Dead", a song which charted following an internet campaign in the wake of the death of former Prime Minister Margaret Thatcher on 8 April. Instead, a portion of the song will air as part of a news item.
Trevor Nelson leaves the station to rejoin BBC Radio 2 and BBC Radio 1Xtra.
September – Tim Westwood leaves the station to rejoin Capital London.

2014
17 February – Sara Cox hosts her last show for the station and leaves to rejoin BBC Radio 2.
7–8 March – BBC Radio 1 marks International Women's Day with two nights of an all-female line-up from 7pm to 7am, featuring presenters including Annie Nightingale and Adele Roberts. The second night is also aired on BBC Radio 1Xtra.
September – A series of changes sees many notable presenters leave the station, including Edith Bowman, Nihal and Rob da Bank. Huw Stephens gains a new show, hosting between 10pm and 1am Monday to Wednesday with Alice Levine, presenting weekends between 1pm and 4pm. Radio 1's Residency is also expanded with Skream joining the rotational line-up on Thursday nights between 10pm and 1am.
Rod McKenzie is dismissed following bullying allegations and is moved to another job outside the BBC.

2015
25 January – Clara Amfo joins and takes over as presenter of The Official Chart.
27 February – Fearne Cotton announces she is to leave the station to start "a new chapter".
5 March – Zane Lowe presents his final show as he leaves the station. 
9 March – Annie Mac replaces Zane Lowe on weekday evenings.
24 March – BBC Radio 1 announces that The Official Chart will move from Sundays to Friday afternoons from mid-July in response to changes in the day new music is released.
22 May – Fearne Cotton leaves.
25 May – Clara Amfo replaces Fearne Cotton on weekday mid-mornings.
June – Schedule changes at BBC Radio 1 and BBC Radio 1Xtra see Adele Roberts presenting the Early Breakfast Show, replacing Gemma Cairney. Cairney has become the station's social action presenter, hosting The Surgery and documentaries for both networks as Aled Haydn Jones leaves the hosting and producing role to become Head of Programmes.
5 July – The final Sunday broadcast of BBC Radio 1's The Official Chart.
10 July – The first Friday broadcast of BBC Radio 1's The Official Chart. The programme is broadcast on Fridays as part of the drive time show, hosted by Greg James. The programme's airtime is almost halved, to just 1 hour 45 minutes with only the top 10 now being played in full.

2016
No events.

2017
30 September – BBC Radio 1 and BBC Radio 2 celebrates its 50th birthday. Commemorations include a three-day pop-up station Radio 1 Vintage celebrating the station's presenters and special on-air programmes on the day itself, including a special breakfast show co-presented by the station's launch DJ Tony Blackburn which is also broadcast on BBC Radio 2.
6 November – BBC Radio 1 has some schedule changes. A new weeknight show is launched, The 8th presented by Charlie Sloth broadcast on BBC Radio 1 and its sister station BBC Radio 1Xtra. Other changes involved Danny Howard, Katie Thistleton, Huw Stephens and Phil Taggart. Kan D Man, DJ Limelight and Rene LaVice join.
November – The Surgery is broadcast for the final time. It is replaced the following week by a new show called Radio 1's Life Hacks hosted by Cel Spellman, Katie Thistleton and Radha Modgil.

2018
24 February – BBC Radio 1 overhauls its weekend schedule. The changes see Maya Jama and Jordan North joining the network as weekend presenters, fronting the Greatest Hits programme, while current presenter Matt Edmondson moves to present a weekday afternoon show on which he will be joined by a different guest co-presenter each week. Alice Levine moves from afternoons to weekend breakfasts to co-present with Dev.
15 June 
Radio 1 starts broadcasting much of its weekend schedule on Fridays meaning that the weekday daytime schedule is now only broadcast from Mondays to Thursdays. 
Scott Mills replaces Greg James as host of The Official Chart.
9 August – Nick Grimshaw presents Radio 1 Breakfast for the final time.
10 August – Chris Smith and Tina Daheley both leave the station after hosting their last Newsbeat bulletins.
20 August – Greg James becomes the 16th person to present Radio 1 Breakfast.
3 September – Nick Grimshaw takes over as host of the drivetime show. Jack Saunders hosts a new show named 'Radio 1's Indie Show'.
9 September – Huw Stephens' BBC Introducing show moves to Sunday nights as part of a shake-up of the Sunday schedule.
3 October – Charlie Sloth announces he will leave BBC Radio 1 and BBC Radio 1Xtra after ten years of broadcasting.
20 October – Having announced earlier in the month that he is leaving BBC Radio 1 and BBC Radio 1Xtra, Charlie Sloth now says this will happen with immediate effect. Previously, he has been scheduled to leave in November.
26 October – BBC Radio 1 announces a schedule change that will see Matt Edmondson and Mollie King co-presenting the Radio 1 Weekend Breakfast Show while Dev and Alice Levine will move to weekend afternoons.
November – Charlie Sloth leaves.
15 November – Tiffany Calver replaces Charlie Sloth on the Rap Show as Tiffany herself joins the station.
26 November – Former Kiss breakfast presenters Rickie Haywood-Williams, Melvin Odoom and Charlie Hedges join the station to replace  Charlie Sloth on the evening show.

2019
5 July – Friday's edition of Radio 1's Dance Anthems is relaunched as Radio 1's Party Anthems.
14 July – The Official Chart: First Look is officially broadcast for the first time and is hosted by Cel Spellman and Katie Thistleton.
6 September – The new early weekend breakfast show is running from Friday to Sunday and is presented by Arielle Free. Mollie King gained a new slot named Best New Pop.

2020s
2020
27 February – Controller of BBC Sounds, Jonathan Wall, announces the launch of a new 24-hour 'Radio 1 Dance' stream on the service in the Spring.
13 March – BBC Radio 1's Big Weekend, scheduled for the Spring Bank Holiday Weekend was cancelled due to the COVID-19 pandemic.
28 March – Radio 1 implements temporary changes to schedule due to the COVID-19 pandemic. The changes see the length of shows across Radio 1 daytime increase, meaning fewer presenters are required in studios throughout the course of the day.
3 May – Maya Jama leaves.
5 August – The station announces a major schedule overhaul which launches from 1 September. The new schedule sees Greg James move to a new time slot, 7am to 10:30am. Clara Amfo’s show moves to 10:30am to 1pm, followed by Scott Mills from 1pm to 3:30pm and Nick Grimshaw from 3:30pm to 6pm. Radio 1's Future Sounds with Annie Mac moves forward an hour to a new 6pm to 8pm slot with the Hottest Record now at 6pm. This is followed by Rickie, Melvin & Charlie from 8pm to 10pm and Jack Saunders from 10pm to midnight.
9 August – Alice Levine leaves.
1 September – Radio 1 schedule returned to normal after it was modified in March, due to the COVID-19 pandemic.
25 September – Toddla T hosted his last show after 11 years of broadcasting as he leaves the station. 
26 September – MistaJam leaves.
2 October – Jeremiah Asiamah takes over Radio 1's Soundsystem, previously hosted by Toddla T.
3 October – Charlie Hedges takes over Radio 1's Dance Anthems.
9 October – BBC Radio 1 Dance launches on BBC Sounds.
19 November – BBC Radio 1 announces plans to play an edited version of the Christmas song Fairytale of New York by The Pogues and Kirsty MacColl over the Christmas period, because it feels its audience may be offended by some of the lyrics.
20 December – Dev Griffin leaves the station after 18 years of broadcasting to join Heart.

2021
9 April – Following the death of Prince Philip, Duke of Edinburgh, regular programming is abandoned for the rest of the day, BBC Radio 1 simulcasts the BBC Radio News special news programme until breaking away at 4pm for a special edition of Newsbeat and then plays appropriate music for the rest of the day. The Official Chart doesn't air for the second time since Princess Diana's tragic death in 1997.
20 April – Annie Mac announces she will leave the station at the end of July. From September, Clara Amfo is to take over Radio 1's Future Sounds and Rickie, Melvin and Charlie will take over the weekday mid-morning show. Other changes include Radio 1's Future Artists with Jack Saunders moving to an earlier slot from 8pm to 10pm on Monday to Wednesday along with Radio 1's Indie Show on Thursdays. Radio 1's Power Down Playlist will become a standalone programme for first time with Sian Eleri hosting from 10pm to 11pm from Monday to Wednesdays. Danny Howard will take over as host of Radio 1's Dance Party on Fridays from 6pm to 8pm and Jaguar will host Radio 1 Dance Introducing on Thursdays from 10pm to 11pm. New presenter Sarah Story will join Radio 1 to host Radio 1's Future Dance on Fridays from 8pm to 10pm.
22 April – BBC Radio 1 Relax launches exclusively on BBC Sounds with little notice. The stream aims to play a selection of well-being focussed music content throughout the day and ASMR and relaxing sounds throughout the night.
30 June – During his drivetime show, Nick Grimshaw announces he will leave the station after 14 years in mid-August. From Monday 6 September, Vick Hope and Jordan North will host a new drivetime show together from Monday to Thursday from 3:30pm to 6pm on the station. Dean McCullough will also permanently join Radio 1 to replace Jordan North's weekend show from Friday to Sunday from 10:30am to 1pm. The first show will air Friday 10 September and will be broadcast from Salford, the first daytime Radio 1 programme to move out of London as part of the BBC's Across The UK plans. Victoria Jane will also join the station to launch a new show, Radio 1 Future Soul, broadcast from Salford.
30 July – Annie Mac presents her final show as she leaves the station after 17 years of broadcasting.
5 August – Clara Amfo presents her final weekday mid-morning show.
12 August – Nick Grimshaw presents his final show as he leaves the station after 14 years of broadcasting.
6 September – Vick Hope and Jordan North begin co-presenting the Radio 1 drivetime show as they replace Nick Grimshaw. Clara Amfo replaces Annie Mac on Monday to Thursday evenings, Sian Eleri also replaces Annie Mac on Radio 1's Power Down Playlist as it becomes a standalone programme for the first time as Sian herself joins the station and Rickie, Melvin, and Charlie replace Clara Amfo on weekday mid-mornings.
9 September – BBC Introducing on Radio 1 Dance broadcasts for the first as Jaguar joins the station.
10 September – Danny Howard replaces Annie Mac on Friday evenings and Radio 1's Future Dance broadcasts for the first time as Sarah Story joins the station.  
11 September – Dean McCullough joins the station and replaces Jordan North on weekends.
13 September – Radio 1's Future Soul broadcasts for the first time as Victoria Jane joins the station.
16 October – Radio 1's Out Out! Live, a music concert to celebrate the return of the night out, will be held at the SSE Arena in Wembley, London.

2022
8 March – It is announced that Mollie King will present a new show, Radio 1's Future Pop on Thursdays from 8-10pm. Monday nights will be dedicated to Rock and Alternative, with the Radio 1 Rock Show with Daniel P Carter moving to 11pm to 1am. Alyx Holcombe will join the station to present Radio 1 Introducing Rock from 1am to 2am following the Radio 1 Rock Show and Nels Hylton will present Radio 1's Future Alternative. Radio 1's Drum & Bass Show will move to Saturday nights from 11pm with Charlie Tee as Renee La Vice leaves the station. Radio 1's Indie Show with Jack Saunders moves to Sundays at 9pm and Radio 1's Soundsystem with Jeremiah Asiamah moves to Saturdays at 7pm. The 1Xtra Takeover with DJ Target will no longer air on Radio 1.
17 May – BBC Radio 1 launches the Presenter Uploader tool to enable potential new presenters to upload their demo tapes to its server. The software is also made available to the entire radio industry.
1 July – It is announced that Scott Mills and Chris Stark will leave the station at the end of August.
5 July – Dean McCullough and Vicky Hawkesworth are announced as the new hosts of Radio 1's afternoon show 1–3:30pm, from Monday 5 September. In addition, Katie Thistleton is announced to be taking over the Friday and Saturday editions of McCullough's weekend show, with Nat O'Leary presenting Radio 1 00's in the Sunday edition's slot.  
28 July – Jack Saunders is announced as the new host of The Official Chart on Radio 1, starting on 9 September. 
5 August – Roisin Hastie announces she will be leaving Newsbeat and ending her contributions to Radio 1 Breakfast with Greg James.
15 August – Calum Leslie is announced as the new Breakfast newsreader for Newsbeat.
25 August – Scott Mills and Chris Stark present their final show. After 24 years on the station, Scott will move to BBC Radio 2 to replace Steve Wright in the Afternoon in October. Chris who spent 10 years at Radio 1, will move to Capital Breakfast to co-host with Roman Kemp, Sonny Jay and Siân Welby in October.
8–10 September & 19 September – Following the death & the funeral of Queen Elizabeth II, BBC Radio 1 abandons half its regular scheduled programming in favour of simulcasting the BBC Radio News special programme and from Friday as well as 19th September, the station broadcasts a revised schedule for near end of the week and over 19th September on the day of the funeral and The Official Chart doesn't air for the third time since Prince Philip, Duke of Edinburgh's death last year.
14 October – Radio 1 hosts Europe's Biggest Dance Show 2022'' with eleven radio stations from across Europe joining together to showcase the best of dance music and Ukraine's Radio Promin joining for the first time.
28 October – Jamie Laing joins Matt Edmondson to co-present weekend afternoons on Radio 1, covering for Mollie King while she is on maternity leave.
25 December – Radio 1 presents a Christmas Day TikTok Takeover between 2pm and 6pm, with ten presenters from the social media platform presenting 30 minute slots.
2023
16 February - Mollie King presents her first Future Pop show back from maternity leave. She spends another 2 weeks off from March 2nd.
26 February - Jamie Laing presents his final show before Mollie King comes back on March 17th. Matt spends two weeks solo interim.
17 March - Mollie King rejoins Matt Edmondson as she returns from maternity leave.

References

BBC Radio 1
Radio 1